Frederick Bates (18 November 1829 – 6 October 1903) was a British brewer and entomologist, known for his collection of Tenebrionoidea (Heteromera). Frederick DuCane Godman purchased this collection of 22,390 specimens; the collection was subsequently sold to the Natural History Museum, London in 1881 and 1897. Until the 1890s, he collected beetle specimens from Great Britain; this collection was later owned by Basil Samuel Williams (nephew of Benjamin Samuel Williams). Bates managed the Eagle Brewery in Leicester before co-founding the Leicester Brewing & Malting Co. in June 1890.

Bates was born in Leicester on 18 November 1829 and died in Chiswick on 6 October 1903.

Taxonomy
Prakasha amariformis (1892)

References

1829 births
1903 deaths
English entomologists